Oxyartes is a genus of stick insects in the family Lonchodidae and tribe Necrosciini; species records are from India through to Indochina.

Species
The Phasmida Species File lists:
 Oxyartes cresphontes (Westwood, 1859)
 Oxyartes densigranulatus Ho, 2020
 Oxyartes despectus (Westwood, 1848) - type species (as Phasma despectum Westwood)
 Oxyartes dorsalis Chen & He, 2008
 Oxyartes guangdongensis Chen & He, 2008
 Oxyartes jinpingensis Ho, 2017
 Oxyartes lamellatus Kirby, 1904
 Oxyartes nigrigranulatus Ho, 2020
 Oxyartes rubris Ho, 2017
 Oxyartes sparsispinosus Ho, 2020
 Oxyartes spinipennis Carl, 1913
 Oxyartes spinulosus Redtenbacher, 1908
 Oxyartes vietnamensis Ho, 2018
 Oxyartes xishuangbannaensis Ho, 2020
 Oxyartes yunnanus Chen & He, 2008

References

External links

Phasmatodea genera
Phasmatodea of Asia
Lonchodidae